Dennis Stratton (born 9 October 1952) is an English guitarist who is best known as a former member of the heavy metal band Iron Maiden from December 1979 to October 1980.

Biography
Born in Canning Town, London, Stratton showed early promise as a footballer and was briefly on the books at West Ham United until age 16, when he took up guitar. A keen fan of the London East End music scene, he joined his first band Harvest (later known as Wedgewood) in 1973. Two years later, Stratton formed the band Remus Down Boulevard, which toured in support of Rory Gallagher and Status Quo, and recorded a live album with music producer Jonathan King.

In December 1979, Steve Harris invited Stratton to join Iron Maiden after witnessing a Remus Down Boulevard performance. The band was also in need of a new drummer, and recruited Clive Burr on Stratton's recommendation. Stratton played on the group's first studio album, Iron Maiden, which was released in April 1980, and on the non-album single "Women in Uniform". Stratton also appeared in the home video recording "Live at the Ruskin" (recorded in 1980 and released in 2004 as part of The History of Iron Maiden – Part 1: The Early Days DVD set), and in the band's first British television appearance, when they performed "Running Free" on Top of the Pops. Stratton was with the band during their first European tour, supporting Kiss.

Dennis Stratton left Iron Maiden in October 1980, and has stated that he left due to conflicts with Steve Harris and band manager Rod Smallwood. Officially, the band stated "musical differences" as the reason for Stratton's departure. He was replaced by Adrian Smith. After his departure from Iron Maiden, Stratton played with bands such as Lionheart and Praying Mantis, with which he recorded nine studio albums from 1990 to 2003. He officially left Praying Mantis in 2006. In 1995 he formed a project called The Original Iron Men with another former Iron Maiden member, singer Paul Di'Anno. The duo released three albums. More recently, Stratton still performs locally in the East London area, sometimes with a reformed version of Remus Down Boulevard, and occasionally tours Europe with various cover bands that play classic Iron Maiden songs. 
Stratton is endorsed by Caparison Guitars, from his tenure with Praying Mantis.

Discography

Remus Down Boulevard
Live - A Week at the Bridge E16 (Sampler, 1978)
Live EP at the Bridge E16 (Sampler, 2002)
The Bridge House - Book Launch & Reunion (DVD, 2007)
Live - Worth the Wait (4th Time Lucky) (CD/DVD, 2011)

Iron Maiden
Iron Maiden (1980)
Live!! +one (1980)
12 Wasted Years (1987)
The First Ten Years (From There to Eternity) (1990)
Best of the Beast (1996)
Ed Hunter (1999)
BBC Archives (2002)
Best of the 'B' Sides (2002)
The History of Iron Maiden – Part 1: The Early Days (2004)
The Essential Iron Maiden (2005)

Lionheart
Hot Tonight (1984)
Second Nature (2017)

Praying Mantis
Live at Last (live) (1990)
Predator in Disguise (1991)
A Cry for the New World (1993)
Only the Children Cry (EP) (1993)
Play in the East (live) (1994)
To the Power of Ten (1995)
Captured Alive in Tokyo City (live) (1996)
Forever in Time (1998)
Nowhere to Hide (2000)
The Journey Goes On (2003)
Captured alive in Tokyo City (Live-DVD)
The Best of Praying Mantis (2004) (Best-of Compilation)

Paul Di'Anno & Dennis Stratton
The Original Iron Men (1995)
The Original Iron Men 2 (1996)
As Hard As Iron (1996)
Made In Iron (1997)

Collaborations
Kaizoku (1989) - Various Authors
All Stars (1990) - Various Authors
Trapped (1990) - Lea Hart
Start 'em Young (1992) - English Steel
Ready to rumble (1992) - True Brits

References

External links
Dennisstratton.com
Lionheart-music.com site 
Interview With Dennis Stratton (2003), Accessed 10 July 2005.
Dennis Stratton Discography, Accessed 10 July 2005.
Praying Mantis fan site

1952 births
Living people
English heavy metal guitarists
English heavy metal singers
English male singers
English rock guitarists
Iron Maiden members
People from Canning Town
English male guitarists